Howell Chambers Brown (1880–1954) American artist and printmaker, known for engraving and etching. His work was often focused on the genre of the American West.

Biography 
Howell Chambers Brown was born July 28, 1880 in Little Rock, Arkansas and at age 16 his family moved to Pasadena, California. His parents were Judge Benjamin Chambers Brown and Mary Broker Brown, and he was one of their five children. His brother was Benjamin Chambers Brown. 

Brown initially attended the Stanford University School of Engineering, eventually he left the engineering department and earned an A.B. degree from Stanford University in May 1904 in Romance Languages. He lived on a ranch in Sinaloa, Mexico for a period of time. In 1914, Brown and his brother Benjamin Brown co-founded the Printmakers of Los Angeles (1914), which later became the Los Angeles Society of Printmakers.

Brown died April 15, 1954 in Pasadena, California.

His work is in various public collections including Fine Arts Museums of San Francisco (FAMSF), Smithsonian American Art Museum, Modern Art Museum of Fort Worth, Mills College Art Museum, among others.

References 

1880 births
1954 deaths
Stanford University alumni
Artists from Pasadena, California
American engravers